William Whipple House at 88 Whipple Road in Kittery, Maine is one of the oldest houses in Maine and was the birthplace of Founding Father, Revolutionary War general, and Declaration of Independence signatory, William Whipple.  The oldest portion of home dates to circa 1660 and was occupied first by Robert Cutt who fortified it as a garrison house. William Whipple was born in the house in 1731 and later he moved to Portsmouth, New Hampshire after his marriage in 1767. In 2017 the house was restored by its new owner Michael Sullivan.

See also
List of the oldest buildings in Maine

References

External links

Houses in Kittery, Maine
Houses completed in 1660
Homes of United States Founding Fathers